The 2008 GAINSCO Auto Insurance Indy 300 was the opening round of the 2008 IndyCar Series season and took place on March 29, 2008 at the  Homestead-Miami Speedway. For the first time in series history, the reigning champion was not on the grid to defend his title, as Dario Franchitti had moved to the No. 40 NASCAR Sprint Cup Series car for Chip Ganassi Racing. Graham Rahal was supposed to make his debut in this race, however due to a crash in testing his team could not get his car repaired in time for the race. 2003 champion Scott Dixon kicked off the season with the victory, on his way to the series championship.

Qualifying 
 All cars run four laps and the car which completes the laps in the quickest time, wins the pole.

 Before the race, the cars of Ed Carpenter and A. J. Foyt IV failed technical inspection, their times were disallowed, and were dropped to 24th and 25th on the grid respectively. All drivers behind them moved up two places from their original grid positions.

Race

References 

Gainsco Auto Insurance Indy 300
Gainsco Auto Insurance Indy 300
Gainsco Auto Insurance Indy 300
Homestead–Miami Indy 300